Rodopouloυ is a neighbourhood in the city of Patras, Achaea, Greece. Its alternative name is Portes.

References
 Ν.Ι. Λυμπέρη, Οδηγός Πατρών, 4η έκδοση, Πάτρα 2005, p. 48 (in Greek)

Neighborhoods in Patras